Rattlepod is a common name for several plants and may refer to:

 Crotalaria species
 Senna covesii
 Astragalus species

Rattlepod is also a common name for tiger moths of the genus Utetheisa, although the word "rattlepod" may not appear in common names at the species level.

See also
Rattlebox
Rattlebush
Rattleweed